NOAAS Ronald H. Brown (R 104) is a  blue-water research vessel of the U.S. National Oceanic and Atmospheric Administration, she is NOAA's only Global-Class research ship. 

The ship is named for United States Secretary of Commerce Ron Brown, who was killed while in office in a plane crash on 3 April 1996 while on a trade mission to Bosnia and Herzegovina.

Construction and commissioning

Ronald H. Brown′s keel was laid at VT Halter Marine's Moss Point shipyard in Pascagoula, Mississippi, in February 1995, and she was launched on 30 May 1996. NOAA commissioned her on 19 July 1997 at her home port,  Charleston, South Carolina.  She was NOAA's first newly built oceanographic research vessel in 17 years.

Technical characteristics

At  in length, Ronald H. Brown is the largest vessel in the NOAA fleet.  Her hull is hardened against ice to allow for Arctic and Antarctic research.  The ship has a total of 59 bunk spaces and can seat 30 at a time in her mess room. The ship also includes a two-bed hospital facility. She carries a complement of six NOAA Corps commissioned officers, one commissioned U.S. Public Health Service medical officer, 22  crew and a maximum of 31 scientists.

The deck equipment features three winches, two fixed cranes, a portable crane, a hydrographic boom, and an A-frame. One of the winches is specifically for use with specialty cables such as optical fiber cables or coaxial EM Cable.

As a research vessel, a substantial amount of the ship is dedicated to laboratories.

In addition to her state-of-the-art oceanographic sampling capabilities, the Ronald H. Brown has instrumentation to study the atmosphere, including a Doppler weather radar for a better understanding of storm dynamics at sea. This combined atmospheric and oceanographic sampling capability makes the ship unique in the world's research fleet. Scientists aboard the vessel can study critical environmental issues across the world's oceans.

Ronald H. Brown and three other research ships were all built to the same basic design. Her three sister ships, all owned by the US Navy, are R/V Thomas G. Thompson, operated by the University of Washington, R/V Roger Revelle, operated by the Scripps Institute of Oceanography, and R/V Atlantis, operated by the Woods Hole Oceanographic Institution.

Operational history

Ronald H. Brown has participated in many national and international projects.

On 18 July 2013, Ronald H. Brown departed Charleston; by the time she returned on 25 March 2017, she had spent 1,347 days deployed, the longest deployment by a NOAA ship in history. During her deployment, she spent almost 800 days at sea and traveled 130,000 nautical miles (149,600 statute miles; 240,760 km), conducting scientific research and servicing more than 80 buoys that collect environmental data on ocean and weather conditions in the tropical ocean. Her scientific activities included the study of ocean acidification and of atmospheric rivers over the Pacific Ocean off the United States West Coast; participation in a first-of-its-kind multi-agency rapid response mission to observe the El Niño of 2015-2016; the taking of more than 1,600 water measurements in the Atlantic Ocean between Iceland and Antarctica and in the Pacific Ocean between Alaska and Antarctica in support of efforts to improve the understanding of the long-term physical properties of the ocean and how they are changing; bathymetric surveys of 353,975 square miles (916,792 square kilometers) of the ocean bottom to map the U.S. Extended Continental Shelf, including surveys conducted near Kingman Reef and Palmyra Atoll in the Pacific Ocean; assessments of the ecology of bays along the Alaska North Slope; and studies of the fisheries and oceanography of the Arctic Ocean off the coast of Alaska.

See also
 NOAA ships and aircraft

References

External links

 

Research vessels of the United States
Thomas G. Thompson-class oceanographic research ships of the National Oceanic and Atmospheric Administration
Ships built in Moss Point, Mississippi
1996 ships
District of Columbia-related ships